Ronald Dickson Woodroof (February 3, 1950 –  September 12, 1992) was an American man who created what would become known as the Dallas Buyer's Club in March 1988, one of several such AIDS buyers clubs that sprang up at the time. After being diagnosed with the human immunodeficiency virus (HIV) in 1985, he created the group as part of his efforts to find and distribute drugs to treat HIV at a time when the disease was poorly understood.

He sued the United States Food and Drug Administration (FDA) over a ban on peptide T, a drug he was using. Woodroof's final years became the basis of the 2013 film Dallas Buyers Club.

Biography
Woodroof was born in Dallas, Texas, on February 3, 1950, to Garland Odell Woodroof (March 17, 1917, in Texas – December 3, 1983, in Dallas) and Willie Mae Hughes (November 25, 1917, in Oklahoma – November 19, 1996, in Dallas).

His first marriage was to Mary Etta Pybus on June 28, 1969, in Dallas; they had a daughter, Yvette Lynn Woodroof (born February 1, 1970). They divorced on March 23, 1972. On May 6, 1972, he married a woman named Rory S. Flynn in Dallas. They divorced on May 21, 1973. He then married Brenda Shari Robin on October 4, 1982, in Lubbock. They divorced on March 4, 1986, after he was diagnosed with HIV.

It was recorded that Mr. Woodroof had a mercurial personality. One reporter writes that "Woodroof took guns to his doctor’s office, prompting Dr. Steven Pounders to 'fire him as a patient.'" Woodroof later sent the doctor roses, and the doctor took him back. Woodroof was said to have lost all his friends after they found out he was HIV-positive. The movie Dallas Buyers Club depicts Woodroof as holding homophobic views prior to contracting HIV. In interviews with Craig Borten, who would go on to write the screenplay for Dallas Buyers Club, Woodroof implied that his diagnosis, along with interactions with gay people living with AIDS through the buyers club, led to him changing his views on gay people. Other people who knew Woodroof said that he did not harbor anti-gay beliefs and claimed he was bisexual.

Dallas Buyer's Club 
After suffering from the side effects of AZT, Ron Woodroof began looking for other drugs he could use to further prolong his life. He acquired nutritional supplements and drugs not approved by the FDA for use in the United States, which he found helpful in ameliorating his symptoms. Woodroof established what he called the Dallas Buyers Club in 1988 as a front for distributing these drugs and other substances to AIDS patients.

Death and afterward 
Seven years following his diagnosis of HIV, Ron Woodroof died on September 12, 1992, from pneumonia brought on by AIDS. He is buried in Restland Memorial Park. Woodroof became the basis of the 2013 film Dallas Buyers Club. He was portrayed in the film by Matthew McConaughey, who won an Academy Award for Best Actor for his performance as Woodroof.

References

External links
 Ron Woodroof at Find A Grave

1950 births
1992 deaths
AIDS-related deaths in Texas
HIV/AIDS activists
American electricians
People from Dallas
Deaths from pneumonia in Texas